The 1939 St. Louis Cardinals season was the team's 58th season in St. Louis, Missouri and the 48th season in the National League.  The Cardinals went 92–61 during the season and finished 2nd in the National League.

Regular season

Season summary 
Shortly after the end of the 1938 season, owner Sam Breadon appointed former reserve Cardinals outfielder Ray Blades as manager.  He had managed many of the organization's top young players in Columbus, Ohio, and Rochester, New York.

A feisty skipper, Blades guided the Cardinals back into the pennant race.  The Cincinnati Reds took over first place on May 26 and never fell back.  The Cards seized second place at midseason and played at a .708 clip in the final 65 games-including a 29–6 record at home the second half, but never could catch the Reds.

The Redbirds made Cincinnati work down the stretch, though.  They took two games from the Reds with the third of the three-game series washed out as a tie, and that pulled the Cards to only 3 and a half games back.  Twice the Cardinals drew a game closer in September.

An old trade haunted the Cards: Paul Derringer, a former St. Louis farmhand, went 25–7 for the Reds.  That record included a 5–3 victory in September that clinched the pennant for the Reds.

The best offense in the league was at least partially responsible for the Cardinals' dramatic turn.  They led the NL in runs and made the most of their speed to head the league in doubles and triples. Their .294 team batting average was 16 points higher than anyone else's.

The trade that sent Dizzy Dean to the Chicago Cubs actually paid some dividends.  Curt Davis, one of the two pitchers picked up in the deal, led the Redbirds' staff in almost every category.  Clyde Shoun, the other ex-Cub, worked a team-high 51 games out of the bullpen.  With rookie Mort Cooper winning 12 games and working more than 200 innings, the Cards pitchers posted the league's second-best ERA.

Season standings

Record vs. opponents

Roster

Player stats

Batting

Starters by position 
Note: Pos = Position; G = Games played; AB = At bats; H = Hits; Avg. = Batting average; HR = Home runs; RBI = Runs batted in

Other batters 
Note: G = Games played; AB = At bats; H = Hits; Avg. = Batting average; HR = Home runs; RBI = Runs batted in

Pitching

Starting pitchers 
Note: G = Games pitched; IP = Innings pitched; W = Wins; L = Losses; ERA = Earned run average; SO = Strikeouts

Other pitchers 
Note: G = Games pitched; IP = Innings pitched; W = Wins; L = Losses; ERA = Earned run average; SO = Strikeouts

Relief pitchers 
Note: G = Games pitched; W = Wins; L = Losses; SV = Saves; ERA = Earned run average; SO = Strikeouts

Awards and honors

Cardinals in the 1939 All-Star Game 
 Pitcher Curt Davis
 Outfielder Joe Medwick
 First baseman Johnny Mize
 Outfielder Terry Moore
 Pitcher Lon Warneke

Farm system 

LEAGUE CHAMPIONS: Rochester, Sacramento, Asheville, Kilgore, Springfield, Albuquerque, Cambridge, Albany, Washington, Gastonia

Notes

References 
 1939 St. Louis Cardinals at Baseball Reference
 1939 St. Louis Cardinals team page at www.baseball-almanac.com

St. Louis Cardinals seasons
Saint Louis Cardinals season
St Louis Cardinals